In probability theory and statistics, the multivariate normal distribution, multivariate Gaussian distribution, or joint normal distribution is a generalization of the one-dimensional (univariate) normal distribution to higher dimensions.  One definition is that a random vector is said to be k-variate normally distributed if every linear combination of its k components has a univariate normal distribution. Its importance derives mainly from the multivariate central limit theorem. The multivariate normal distribution is often used to describe, at least approximately, any set of (possibly) correlated real-valued random variables each of which clusters around a mean value.

Definitions

Notation and parameterization 
The multivariate normal distribution of a k-dimensional random vector  can be written in the following notation:
 
or to make it explicitly known that X is k-dimensional,
 
with k-dimensional mean vector

and  covariance matrix

Standard normal random vector
A real random vector  is called a standard normal random vector if all of its components  are independent and each is a zero-mean unit-variance normally distributed random variable, i.e. if  for all .

Centered normal random vector
A real random vector  is called a centered normal random vector if there exists a deterministic  matrix  such that  has the same distribution as  where  is a standard normal random vector with  components.

Normal random vector
A real random vector  is called a normal random vector if there exists a random -vector , which is a standard normal random vector, a -vector , and a  matrix , such that .

Formally:

In the degenerate case where the covariance matrix is singular, the corresponding distribution has no density; see the section below for details.  This case arises frequently in statistics; for example, in the distribution of the vector of residuals in the ordinary least squares regression. The  are in general not independent; they can be seen as the result of applying the matrix  to a collection of independent Gaussian variables .

Equivalent definitions 
The following definitions are equivalent to the definition given above. A random vector  has a multivariate normal distribution if it satisfies one of the following equivalent conditions.
Every linear combination  of its components is normally distributed. That is, for any constant vector , the random variable  has a univariate normal distribution, where a univariate normal distribution with zero variance is a point mass on its mean.

The spherical normal distribution can be characterised as the unique distribution where components are independent in any orthogonal coordinate system.

Density function

Non-degenerate case
The multivariate normal distribution is said to be "non-degenerate" when the symmetric covariance matrix  is positive definite. In this case the distribution has density

The equation above reduces to that of the univariate normal distribution if  is a  matrix (i.e. a single real number).

The circularly symmetric version of the complex normal distribution has a slightly different form.

Each iso-density locus — the locus of points in k-dimensional space each of which gives the same particular value of the density — is an ellipse or its higher-dimensional generalization; hence the multivariate normal is a special case of the elliptical distributions.

The quantity  is known as the Mahalanobis distance, which represents the distance of the test point  from the mean . Note that in the case when , the distribution reduces to a univariate normal distribution and the Mahalanobis distance reduces to the absolute value of the standard score. See also Interval below.

Bivariate case
In the 2-dimensional nonsingular case, the probability density function of a vector  is:

In this case,
 

The bivariate iso-density loci plotted in the  -plane are ellipses, whose principal axes are defined by the eigenvectors of the covariance matrix  (the major and minor semidiameters of the ellipse equal the square-root of the ordered eigenvalues).

As the absolute value of the correlation parameter   increases, these loci are squeezed toward the following line :

 

Degenerate case
If the covariance matrix  is not full rank, then the multivariate normal distribution is degenerate and does not have a density. More precisely, it does not have a density with respect to k-dimensional Lebesgue measure (which is the usual measure assumed in calculus-level probability courses). Only random vectors whose distributions are absolutely continuous with respect to a measure are said to have densities (with respect to that measure).

To talk about densities meaningfully in singular cases, then, we must select a different base measure. Using the disintegration theorem we can define a restriction of Lebesgue measure to the -dimensional affine subspace of  where the Gaussian distribution is supported, i.e. . With respect to this measure the distribution has the density of the following motif:

Cumulative distribution function 
The notion of cumulative distribution function (cdf) in dimension 1 can be extended in two ways to the multidimensional case, based on rectangular and ellipsoidal regions.

Another way is to define the cdf  as the probability that a sample lies inside the ellipsoid determined by its Mahalanobis distance  from the Gaussian, a direct generalization of the standard deviation.
In order to compute the values of this function, closed analytic formulae exist, as follows.

Interval

The interval for the multivariate normal distribution yields a region consisting of those vectors x satisfying

When  the expression defines the interior of an ellipse and the chi-squared distribution simplifies to an exponential distribution with mean equal to two (rate equal to half).

Complementary cumulative distribution function (tail distribution) 
The  complementary cumulative distribution function (ccdf) or the tail distribution  
When , then
the ccdf can be written as a probability the  maximum of dependent Gaussian variables:

While no simple closed formula exists for computing the ccdf, the maximum of dependent Gaussian variables can 
be estimated accurately via the Monte Carlo method.

Properties

Probability in different domains

Higher moments

The kth-order moments of x are given by

where 

The kth-order central moments are as follows

where the sum is taken over all allocations of the set  into λ (unordered) pairs. That is, for a kth  central moment, one sums the products of  covariances (the expected value μ is taken to be 0 in the interests of parsimony):

 

This yields  terms in the sum (15 in the above case), each being the product of λ (in this case 3) covariances. For fourth order moments (four variables) there are three terms. For sixth-order moments there are  terms, and for eighth-order moments there are  terms.

The covariances are then determined by replacing the terms of the list  by the corresponding terms of  the list consisting of r1 ones, then r2 twos, etc.. To illustrate this, examine the following 4th-order central moment case:

 

where  is the covariance of Xi and Xj. With the above method one first finds the general case for a kth moment with k different X variables, and then one simplifies this accordingly.

Functions of a normal vector

If  is a general scalar-valued function of a normal vector, its probability density function, cumulative distribution function, and inverse cumulative distribution function can be computed with the numerical method of ray-tracing (Matlab code).

Likelihood function

If the mean and covariance matrix are known, the log likelihood of an observed vector  is simply the log of the probability density function:

,

The circularly symmetric version of the noncentral complex case, where  is a vector of complex numbers, would be

i.e. with the conjugate transpose (indicated by ) replacing the normal transpose (indicated by ).  This is slightly different than in the real case, because the circularly symmetric version of the complex normal distribution has a slightly different form for the normalization constant.

A similar notation is used for multiple linear regression.

Since the log likelihood of a normal vector is a quadratic form of the normal vector, it is distributed as a generalized chi-squared variable.

Differential entropy

The differential entropy of the multivariate normal distribution is

Kullback–Leibler divergence

where  is the dimension of the vector space.

The logarithm must be taken to base e since the two terms following the logarithm are themselves base-e logarithms of expressions that are either factors of the density function or otherwise arise naturally.  The equation therefore gives a result measured in nats.  Dividing the entire expression above by loge 2 yields the divergence in bits.

When ,

Mutual information
The resulting formula for mutual information is:

In the bivariate case the expression for the mutual information is:

Joint normality

Normally distributed and independent

However, a pair of jointly normally distributed variables need not be independent (would only be so if uncorrelated).

Two normally distributed random variables need not be jointly bivariate normal

The fact that two random variables  and  both have a normal distribution does not imply that the pair  has a joint normal distribution.  A simple example is one in which X has a normal distribution with expected value 0 and variance 1, and  if  and  if , where .  There are similar counterexamples for more than two random variables. In general, they sum to a mixture model.

Correlations and independence

In general, random variables may be uncorrelated but statistically dependent.  But if a random vector has a multivariate normal distribution then any two or more of its components that are uncorrelated are independent.  This implies that any two or more of its components that are pairwise independent are independent. But, as pointed out just above, it is not true that two random variables that are (separately, marginally) normally distributed and uncorrelated are independent.

Conditional distributions

If N-dimensional x is partitioned as follows

and accordingly μ and Σ are partitioned as follows

then the distribution of x1 conditional on x2 = a is multivariate normal  where

and covariance matrix

The matrix  is the Schur complement of Σ22 in Σ. That is, the equation above is equivalent to inverting the overall covariance matrix, dropping the rows and columns corresponding to the variables being conditioned upon, and inverting back to get the conditional covariance matrix.

.

The matrix Σ12Σ22−1 is known as the matrix of regression coefficients.

Bivariate case 

 

Bivariate conditional expectation

In the general case

The conditional expectation of X1 given X2 is:

 

In the centered case with unit variances

The conditional expectation of X1 given X2 is

 

and the conditional variance is

 

thus the conditional variance does not depend on x2.

The conditional expectation of X1 given that X2 is smaller/bigger than z is:

where the final ratio here is called the inverse Mills ratio.

Proof: the last two results are obtained using the result , so that

 and then using the properties of the expectation of a truncated normal distribution.

Marginal distributions
To obtain the marginal distribution over a subset of multivariate normal random variables, one only needs to drop the irrelevant variables (the variables that one wants to marginalize out) from the mean vector and the covariance matrix.  The proof for this follows from the definitions of multivariate normal distributions and linear algebra.

Example

Let  be multivariate normal random variables with mean vector  and covariance matrix Σ (standard parametrization for multivariate normal distributions).
.

Affine transformation

If  is an affine transformation of  where c is an  vector of constants and B is a constant  matrix, then Y has a multivariate normal distribution with expected value  and variance BΣBT i.e., . In particular, any subset of the Xi has a marginal distribution that is also multivariate normal.
To see this, consider the following example: to extract the subset (X1, X2, X4)T, use

which extracts the desired elements directly.

This result follows by using

Observe how the positive-definiteness of Σ implies that the variance of the dot product must be positive.

An affine transformation of X such as 2X is not the same as the sum of two independent realisations of X.

Geometric interpretation

The equidensity contours of a non-singular multivariate normal distribution are ellipsoids (i.e. affine transformations of hyperspheres) centered at the mean. Hence the multivariate normal distribution is an example of the class of elliptical distributions. The directions of the principal axes of the ellipsoids are given by the eigenvectors of the covariance matrix . The squared relative lengths of the principal axes are given by the corresponding eigenvalues.

If  is an eigendecomposition where the columns of U are unit eigenvectors and Λ is a diagonal matrix of the eigenvalues, then we have

Moreover, U can be chosen to be a rotation matrix, as inverting an axis does not have any effect on N(0, Λ), but inverting a column changes the sign of U's determinant. The distribution N(μ, Σ) is in effect N(0, I) scaled by Λ1/2, rotated by U and translated by μ.

Conversely, any choice of μ, full rank matrix U, and positive diagonal entries Λi yields a non-singular multivariate normal distribution. If any Λi is zero and U is square, the resulting covariance matrix UΛUT is singular. Geometrically this means that every contour ellipsoid is infinitely thin and has zero volume in n-dimensional space, as at least one of the principal axes has length of zero; this is the degenerate case.

"The radius around the true mean in a bivariate normal random variable, re-written in polar coordinates (radius and angle), follows a Hoyt distribution."

In one dimension the probability of finding a sample of the normal distribution in the interval  is approximately 68.27%, but in higher dimensions the probability of finding a sample in the region of the standard deviation ellipse is lower.

Statistical inference

Parameter estimation

The derivation of the maximum-likelihood estimator of the covariance matrix of a multivariate normal distribution is straightforward.

In short, the  probability density function (pdf) of a multivariate normal is

and the ML estimator of the covariance matrix from a sample of n observations is

which is simply the sample covariance matrix.  This is a biased estimator whose expectation is

An unbiased sample covariance is

  (matrix form;  is the  identity matrix, J is a  matrix of ones; the term in parentheses is thus the  centering matrix)

The Fisher information matrix for estimating the parameters of a multivariate normal distribution has a closed form expression. This can be used, for example, to compute the Cramér–Rao bound for parameter estimation in this setting. See Fisher information for more details.

Bayesian inference
In Bayesian statistics, the conjugate prior of the mean vector is another multivariate normal distribution, and the conjugate prior of the covariance matrix is an inverse-Wishart distribution  .  Suppose then that n observations have been made

and that a conjugate prior has been assigned, where

where

and

Then,

where

Multivariate normality tests 

Multivariate normality tests check a given set of data for similarity to the multivariate normal distribution.  The null hypothesis is that the data set is similar to the normal distribution, therefore a sufficiently small p-value indicates non-normal data. Multivariate normality tests include the Cox–Small test
and Smith and Jain's adaptation of the Friedman–Rafsky test created by Larry Rafsky and Jerome Friedman.

Mardia's test is based on multivariate extensions of skewness and kurtosis measures. For a sample {x1, ..., xn} of k-dimensional vectors we compute
 
Under the null hypothesis of multivariate normality, the statistic A will have approximately a chi-squared distribution with  degrees of freedom, and B will be approximately standard normal N(0,1).

Mardia's kurtosis statistic is skewed and converges very slowly to the limiting normal distribution.  For medium size samples , the parameters of the asymptotic distribution of the kurtosis statistic are modified For small sample tests empirical critical values are used. Tables of critical values for both statistics are given by Rencher for k = 2, 3, 4.

Mardia's tests are affine invariant but not consistent.  For example, the multivariate skewness test is not consistent against
symmetric non-normal alternatives.

The BHEP test computes the norm of the difference between the empirical characteristic function and the theoretical characteristic function of the normal distribution. Calculation of the norm is performed in the L2(μ) space of square-integrable functions with respect to the Gaussian weighting function . The test statistic is
 
The limiting distribution of this test statistic is a weighted sum of chi-squared random variables, however in practice it is more convenient to compute the sample quantiles using the Monte-Carlo simulations.

A detailed survey of these and other test procedures is available.

Classification into multivariate normal classes

Gaussian Discriminant Analysis
Suppose that observations (which are vectors) are presumed to come from one of several multivariate normal distributions, with known means and covariances. Then any given observation can be assigned to the distribution from which it has the highest probability of arising. This classification procedure is called Gaussian discriminant analysis.
The classification performance, i.e. probabilities of the different classification outcomes, and the overall classification error, can be computed by the numerical method of ray-tracing  (Matlab code).

Computational methods

Drawing values from the distribution

A widely used method for drawing (sampling) a random vector x from the N-dimensional multivariate normal distribution with mean vector μ and covariance matrix Σ works as follows:

 Find any real matrix A such that . When Σ is positive-definite, the Cholesky decomposition is typically used, and the extended form of this decomposition can always be used  (as the covariance matrix may be only positive semi-definite) in both cases a suitable matrix A is obtained. An alternative is to use the matrix A = UΛ½ obtained from a spectral decomposition Σ = UΛU−1 of Σ. The former approach is more computationally straightforward but the matrices A change for different orderings of the elements of the random vector, while the latter approach gives matrices that are related by simple re-orderings. In theory both approaches give equally good ways of determining a suitable matrix A, but there are differences in computation time.
 Let  be a vector whose components are N independent standard normal variates (which can be generated, for example, by using the Box–Muller transform).
 Let x be . This has the desired distribution due to the affine transformation property.

See also 
 Chi distribution, the pdf of the 2-norm (Euclidean norm or vector length) of a multivariate normally distributed vector (uncorrelated and zero centered).
 Rayleigh distribution, the pdf of the vector length of a bivariate normally distributed vector (uncorrelated and zero centered)
 Rice distribution, the pdf of the vector length of a bivariate normally distributed vector (uncorrelated and non-centered)
 Hoyt distribution, the pdf of the vector length of a bivariate normally distributed vector (correlated and centered)
 Complex normal distribution, an application of bivariate normal distribution
  Copula, for the definition of the Gaussian or normal copula model.
 Multivariate t-distribution, which is another widely used spherically symmetric multivariate distribution.
 Multivariate stable distribution extension of the multivariate normal distribution, when the index (exponent in the characteristic function) is between zero and two.
 Mahalanobis distance
 Wishart distribution
 Matrix normal distribution

References

Literature 

 
 

Continuous distributions
Multivariate continuous distributions
Normal distribution
Exponential family distributions
Stable distributions